The KR women's basketball team, commonly known as KR, is the women's basketball department of Knattspyrnufélag Reykjavíkur and is based in Reykjavík, Iceland. It is the second winningest team in Úrvalsdeild kvenna history with 14 Icelandic championships, the last coming in 2010.

Honors
 Úrvalsdeild kvenna (14):
1961, 1977, 1979, 1980, 1981, 1982, 1983, 1985, 1986, 1987, 1999, 2001, 2002, 2010

 Icelandic Basketball Cup (10):
1976, 1977, 1982, 1983, 1986, 1987, 1999, 2001, 2002, 2009

 Icelandic Basketball Super Cup (4):
1999, 2009, 2010, 2011

 Icelandic Company Cup (2):
2000, 2009

 Division I:
2018

Season by season

Notes1 2020 playoffs canceled due to the Coronavirus pandemic in Iceland.

Notable players

Coaches

References

External links
Official Website
Eurobasket team profile
KKÍ: KR – kki.is 

KR (basketball)
Sport in Reykjavík
Knattspyrnufélag Reykjavíkur